Kairali literally means "originating from Kerala". Or anything at all related to Kerala. It may refer to:
  Malayalam language 
  Kairali TV, a Malayalam television channel
 , an Indian merchant ship which disappeared in 1979

See also 
 Dhundi-Kairali dialect, spoken in parts of Punjab and Azad Kashmir